The Magnificent Brute is a 1936 American drama film directed by John G. Blystone and starring Victor McLaglen, Binnie Barnes and Jean Dixon. It was nominated for an Academy Award for Best Art Direction by Albert S. D'Agostino and Jack Otterson.

Synopsis
Steve Andrews gets himself at a steel mill but soon makes an enemy of fellow worker Bill Morgan by winning a competition as the most productive worker and then beating him at arm wrestling. He wins the admiration of the landlady of the boarding house and her ten-year old son but then disappoints them both by moving to another lodging and taking up with Della, the girlfriend of his rival worker. Eventually he is able to redeem himself.

Cast

References

Bibliography
 Freese, Gene. Classic Movie Fight Scenes: 75 Years of Bare Knuckle Brawls, 1914-1989. McFarland, 2017.

External links

1936 films
1936 crime drama films
American crime drama films
American black-and-white films
Films directed by John G. Blystone
Universal Pictures films
1930s English-language films
1930s American films